Robert Frederick Lockhart (26 August 1940 – 25 October 2010) was an Australian rules footballer who played with Richmond in the Victorian Football League (VFL).		

Lockhart was recruited from the Mansfield Football Club.

Notes

External links 
		

1940 births
2010 deaths
Australian rules footballers from Victoria (Australia)
Richmond Football Club players